Mangseng is an Austronesian language of New Britain, Papua New Guinea. It is a distinct branch of the Arawe dialect chain.

References

Arawe languages
Languages of East New Britain Province
Languages of West New Britain Province